Portal Reloaded is a 2021 free fan modification for Portal 2 created by German developer Jannis Brinkmann. As in the official Portal games, gameplay involves solving puzzles by manipulating portals which allow the player to move through space. Additionally, the mod allows players to shoot a third "time portal", allowing traversal across two versions of the puzzle chamber in different time periods. Initially envisioned as a smaller project, the game was released as a full-scale mod on April 19, 2021, receiving positive reception by multiple gaming outlets.

Gameplay 

As with the official games in the Portal franchise, Portal Reloaded takes place in the Aperture Science facility, where the player character solves a variety of puzzles in test chambers. Players are equipped with a "portal gun", allowing them to create holes that connect disparate areas in three-dimensional space. Unique to the mod is a third "time portal", allowing the player to traverse between the same point in two alternate versions of the test chamber, located respectively in the past and the future. The game also involves solving puzzles with other testing elements introduced in the official series, such as buttons, cubes, lasers, and light bridges.

If an object – such as a cube or a conventional portal – is manipulated in the past, it moves in the future chamber as well, causing its previous copy to fizzle. However, objects in the future can be moved independently of their past equivalents. While past objects cannot be taken through the time portal into the future (causing a paradox), future variants of an object can be brought into the past. A future variant of an object brought into the past does not create another future variant of itself. Therefore, careful usage of puzzle elements allows the player to have a duplicate of any puzzle element that can be brought through the time portal. 

Unlike Portal 2, which it is based on, the game does not feature a co-op mode. The developer has stated that the mod is intended as a smaller-scale complement to the original game, in contrast to other modifications such as Portal Stories: Mel. It is intended for "veteran players", being more challenging than the official games.

Plot 

Portal Reloaded is intended to take place in the same universe as the official Portal games; according to the developer, the narrative is designed to not interfere with that of the original series. The player assumes the role of test subject 4509 in the Aperture Science Enrichment Center, who is awoken from stasis to take part in a "Time Travel Testing Course".

Navigating various test chambers using the portal gun, they learn how to use time portals to navigate between a version of Aperture's laboratories in the past and a dilapidated and broken version twenty years in the future, which the facility's artificial intelligence overseer states has been damaged as a visual aid. As the game progresses, it is revealed that the main character was the only one who survived initial time travel, and that Aperture cannot get it to work in any way other than the twenty-year interval. Near the end, the overseer admits the Enrichment Center was in fact destroyed under mysterious circumstances involving a "rogue test subject". They reveal the actual purpose of the testing track – to train the player character to kill the rogue subject, preventing the destruction of Aperture's facility.

At the end of the game, the main character is sent back to a stasis chamber. The player can either obey this order, or escape through a time portal to the future. If the player does the former, the test subject successfully returns to stasis, with the AI commenting that they will now "change the course of history", possibly causing the events of Portal to never happen. Otherwise, the player escapes via an elevator, and their portal gun is deactivated. Once reaching the surface, they encounter headcrab zombies at the exit (referencing Half-Life).

Development 
The project was started in 2014 by German developer Jannis Brinkmann as a side project, without the intention of turning it into a full-scale mod. All of the mod's gameplay alterations were done via a scripting language, instead of Portal 2s code directly. It was released for free on Steam on April 19, 2021, to coincide with Portal 2s ten-year anniversary.

Reception 
Portal: Reloaded was positively received by multiple gaming reviewers, who considered it a well-designed complement to the official Portal series. Martin Francis Doherty of Game Rant described the addition of the time portal as a "clever move".  Comparing it to other time-travel based works, he stated that the mechanic was a slower-paced addition which reflected the decaying nature of Aperture's facility. Writing for PC Gamer, Rick Lane stated that it "recaptures the wow factor of the original game", though he conceded that the additional elements in the puzzles could cause frustration occasionally. Rick Lane, reviewing for Bit-Tech described the game as 'phenomenal' and ' possibly the most brilliant puzzle game I’ve played in the last few years'. His only criticism was the short length.

References

External links
 

2021 video games
Fangames
Source (game engine) mods
First-person shooters
Puzzle video games
Laboratories in fiction
Portal (series)
Video games about time travel
Video games developed in Germany